Garamduz District is in Khoda Afarin County, East Azerbaijan province, Iran. At the 2006 National Census, its population (as Garamduz Rural District of Khoda Afarin District in Kaleybar County) was 11,434 in 2,360 households. The following census in 2011 counted 12,964 people in 3,312 households, by which time Khoda Afarin County was established and the rural district raised to the status of a district and divided into two rural districts. At the latest census in 2016, the district had 12,544 inhabitants in 3,715 households.

References 

Khoda Afarin County

Districts of East Azerbaijan Province

Populated places in East Azerbaijan Province

Populated places in Khoda Afarin County